Anilio (literally "without sun") is a village and a community in the municipal unit of Mouresi in the eastern part of Magnesia, Greece. It is situated at 296 meters elevation on the forested eastern slope of the Pelion mountains, 2 km from the Aegean Sea coast. Its population in 2011 was 355 for the village and 382 for the community which includes the village Plaka. Anilio is 1.5 km northwest of Agios Dimitrios, 1.5 km southeast of Makryrrachi, 4 km southeast of Zagora and about 18 km east of the city of Volos (Magnesia's capital).

Population

External links
Homepage of Anilio on its municipality's homepage
 
Anilio on GTP Travel Pages (in English and Greek)

See also

List of settlements in the Magnesia regional unit

References

Populated places in Pelion